Kōgaṇṇu (Dhivehi: ކޯގަންޱު) is the oldest cemetery in the Maldives. Kōgaṇṇu cemetery is located in the island of Meedhoo in Addu Atoll. The cemetery was built about 900 years ago for the purpose of burying the first Muslims of Addu Atoll. Kōgaṇṇu is a Muslim necropolis. The largest tombstone in the country is also found in this cemetery. It is believed that this tombstone dates back to the 18th century and belongs to one of the royals of the Maldives. Many historical writings of Maldives are found in Kōgaṇṇu.

See also
 Meedhoo (Addu)

References

Cemeteries in the Maldives